John Egerton, 2nd Earl of Bridgewater PC (30 May 1623 – 26 October 1686) was an English nobleman from the Egerton family.

Life

He was a son of John Egerton, 1st Earl of Bridgewater and his wife Lady Frances Stanley. His maternal grandparents were Ferdinando Stanley, 5th Earl of Derby and his wife Alice Spencer. According to the Will of King Henry VIII, his mother, at one time, was second-in-line to inherit England's throne.  However, Lady Frances Stanley's older sister, Anne Stanley, Countess of Castlehaven, was passed over for King James VI of Scotland.

He served as Lord Lieutenant of Buckinghamshire (1660–1686), Cheshire (1670–1676), Lancashire (1670–1676), and Hertfordshire (1681–1686), in addition to being invested as a Privy Councillor in 1679.  He was buried in Little Gaddesden, Hertfordshire.

Family

In 1641, Egerton married Elizabeth Cavendish (1626–1663), a daughter of William Cavendish, 1st Duke of Newcastle and his first wife Elizabeth Basset. Their children included:

John Egerton, 3rd Earl of Bridgewater (9 November 1646 – 19 March 1701)
William Egerton (born 15 August 1649), who married Honora Leigh
Thomas Egerton of Tatton Park, ancestor of the Barons and Earls Egerton
Two other sons
Charles Egerton
Elizabeth Egerton (24 August 1653 - 1709), who married Robert Sidney, 4th Earl of Leicester
Two other daughters.

External links
A family tree of the Egerton family

|-

|-

|-

1623 births
1686 deaths
02
Lord-Lieutenants of Buckinghamshire
Lord-Lieutenants of Cheshire
Lord-Lieutenants of Hertfordshire
Lord-Lieutenants of Lancashire
Members of the Privy Council of England
17th-century English nobility
John